The M1 is a short metropolitan route in East London, South Africa.

Route 
The M1 begins at the intersection with the R72 in the East London CBD as 'Oxford Street' and runs north-northwest through the suburbs of North End, Belgravia and Southernwood. As it enters the suburb of Selborne it becomes 'Union Avenue' turning north-east and running parallel with the railway. It then enters Vincent where it intersects with Bell Road at a traffic circle and becomes 'Western Avenue'. It turns northwards and then north-eastwards before crossing over the N2 freeway which connects to Mthatha and King William's Town at the exit 1047 off-ramp north of Vincent. It ends at the M11 in Dorchester Heights.

References 

Transport in the Eastern Cape